Japanese football in 1930.

Emperor's Cup

National team

Results

Players statistics

Births
April 2 - Yoshinori Shigematsu
July 7 - Tadao Kobayashi
September 5 - Ken Naganuma

External links

 
Seasons in Japanese football